That Christmas is an upcoming British computer-animated Christmas fantasy comedy film produced by Locksmith Animation, animated by DNEG Animation and distributed by Netflix. It is directed by Simon Otto in his directorial debut and based on the book of the same name by Richard Curtis.

Premise

Production

Development and production
In November 2019, it was announced that Locksmith Animation was developing That Christmas, an animated feature based on a series of children's books by Richard Curtis. In May 2022, Locksmith Animation confirmed that it awarded the digital production of its second movie That Christmas to DNEG Animation, following their collaboration on Locksmith’s debut film, Ron's Gone Wrong. In June 2022, That Christmas was unveiled as part of Netflix's slate of animated films with the first look of the film. The production started before the slate. The production and screening were finished in February 2023 with the help of DNEG Animation.

Animation and design
Animation was provided by DNEG Animation. Animation for the film was done remotely due to the COVID-19 pandemic. The film's character designs were inspired by Ron's Gone Wrong, and the snow design was inspired by The Boss Baby: Family Business.

Release
That Christmas was originally expected to be released by Warner Bros. Pictures under its Warner Animation Group banner. However, in June 2022, Netflix acquired the distribution rights to the film with Netflix Animation under its label, although Warner Bros. Pictures was not involved with this film. In February 2023, Locksmith says "What a day...a huge thanks to everyone who came to the screening. How incredible it is to see That Christmas gradually coming alive on screen" which could probably mean the production is finished and reveal the release date of the film.

References

External links

 

2020s British animated films
2020s English-language films
3D animated films
Animated Christmas films
British children's animated films
British Christmas comedy films
British computer-animated films
Netflix Animation films
Upcoming films
Upcoming Netflix original films